Basavaraju Venkata Padmanabha Rao (20 August 1931 – 20 February 2010), known mononymously as Padmanabham, was an Indian actor, comedian, producer, and director who predominantly worked in Telugu cinema and Telugu theatre. He is known for his comic expressions and dialogues. In a career spanning over six decades, he acted in more than 400 films.

Padmanabham made his film debut as a child actor in 1945 with Mayalokam. Shavukaru (1949) was his first major hit and gave him a footing as a comedian. Pathala Bhairavi (1951) helped him find a permanent place in Telugu cinema. He acted in small roles alongside Relangi and Ramana Reddy in the golden era of Telugu cinema in the 1950s and 1960s. Later, he became a prominent comedian and remained so till the mid-1970s when Rajababu burst on the scene and replaced him. 

He also directed eight films including Kathanayika Molla (1969), a biographical film which won him the state Nandi Award. Padmanabham introduced S. P. Balasubrahmanyam to the film industry through Sri Sri Sri Maryada Ramanna (1967).

Early life
Padmanabham was born to Basavaraju Venkata Seshayya and Santhamma in Simhadripuram near Pulivendula in Kadapa district, Andhra Pradesh, on 20 August 1931. He was a regular yoga practitioner and enjoyed good health till his death.

Career 
He started acting in his teenage when the director Gudavalli Ramabrahmam gave him a chance in Maayalokam (1945). Throughout his acting career he worked with almost 80 directors and acted in more than 400 movies. Padmanabham cherished his association with Gudavalli Ramabrahmam, Ghantasala Balaramayya, L. V. Prasad, and K. V. Reddy the most.

Padmanabham found it hard to mention any particular comic role as his most memorable one, but made a special mention of the role of a rickshaw puller that he played in Desoddhaarakudu (1975). "It had ample measure of 'karuna rasa' in it and I could display the other shade of my talent," he said. The role became famous for the song "Aakalayyi Annamadigithe Pichchodannaru Naayaallu".

Death
Padmanabham died at his residence at Rangarajapuram, Kodambakkam, in Chennai at 8 am on 20 February 2010 due to a heart attack. He was survived by his wife, five daughters, and son. One of his sons died in September 2009.

Selected filmography

As actor

	1945	Mayalokam	
	1946	Narada Naradi	
	1946	Tyagayya
	1947	Yogi Vemana
	1948	Vindhyarani
	1948	Bhakta Siriyala
	1950	Shavukaru	
	1951	Pathala Bhairavi as Dingiri
	1954	Sri Kalahastiswara Mahatyam	 as Kaasi
	1955	Jayasimha	as Subuddhi
	1955	Santanam as Sekhar
	1957	Bhagya Rekha	
	1957	Kutumba Gowravam as Prathap
	1957	Panduranga Mahatyam as Pundarika's brother
	1958	Appu Chesi Pappu Koodu as Panakala Rao
	1959	Krishna Leelalu	
   1959    Rechukka Pagatichukka
	1960	Raja Makutam	
	1961	Bharya Bharthalu as Anjaneyulu
	1961	Iddaru Mitrulu	
	1961	Velugu Needalu	
	1961	Vagdanam as Padmanabham
	1962	Aatma Bandhuvu 
	1962	Gulebakavali Katha
   1962    Swarna Manjari as Srimukhudu
	1962	Dakshayagnam as Daksha's Younger son
	1962	Kula Gothralu	
	1963	Punarjanma
	1963	Chaduvukunna Ammayilu as Anand
   1963    Valmiki
	1963	Mooga Manasulu as Radha's Husband
   1964    Vivaha Bandham
	1964	Bobbili Yudham	
	1964	Devatha	
	1964	Dr. Chakravarthy	
	1964	Kalavari Kodalu as Bheema Rao
	1965	Veerabhimanyu
	1965	Pandava Vanavasam as Lakshmana Kumarudu
	1965	Tene Manasulu	
   1965    Prameelarjuneeyam as Narada
   1965    Pratigna Palana
	1966	Sri Krishna Tulabharam	
	1966	Leta Manasulu as Sundaram
   1966    Shakuntala
	1966	Pidugu Ramudu	
	1966	Chilaka Gorinka	
	1966	Paramanandayya Shishyula Katha as Nandhi
	1966	Potti Pleader
   1966    Mangalasutram
	1967	Aada Paduchu
   1967    Gruhalakshmi
	1967	Kanchu Kota	
	1967	Ave Kallu	
	1967	Bhakta Prahlada	as Markudu
	1967	Goodachari 116	
	1967	Grihalakshmi	
	1967	Poola Rangadu as Bujji	
	1967	Sri Sri Sri Maryada Ramanna	as Maryada Ramanna
	1967	Gopaludu Bhoopaludu	
   1968    Uma Chandi Gowri Shankarula Katha
	1968	Bhagya Chakramu	
	1968	Lakshmi Nivasam	
	1968	Ramu	
	1968	Niluvu Dopidi
   1968    Nindu Samsaram
	1968	Baghdad Gaja Donga as Hero's friend
	1969	Adrushtavanthalu as Jackie
	1969	Aatmiyulu	
	1969	Jatakaratna Midathambotlu as Midathambotlu
   1969    Bhale Rangadu
	1969	Natakala Rayudu	as Rajasekhar
	1969	Buddhimanthudu	
	1969	Kathanayakudu	
	1969	Mooga Nomu
	1969	Karpura Harathi
   1969    Aadarsa Kutumbam
	1970	Kathanayika Molla as Tenali Ramakrishna
	1970	Dharma Daata	
	1970	Nirdoshi	
	1970	Akka Chellelu
   1971    Manasu Mangalyam
   1971    Pavitra Bandham
	1971	Adrusta Jathakudu	
	1971	Mattilo Manikyam	
	1971	Jeevitha Chakram	
	1971	Dasara Bullodu	
	1971	Sri Krishna Vijayamu	
	1972	Vichitra Bandham as Chittibabu
	1972	Datta Putrudu
   1972    Sri Krishna Satya
   1972    Antha Mana Manchike
   1973    Bangaru Babu
	1973	Vaade Veedu	
	1973	Desoddharakulu	
	1973	Dabbuki Lokam Dasoham	
   1973    Jeevana Tarangalu as Anji
   1973    Manchivadu
	1973	Ganga Manga	
   1974    Chakravakam as Sriram
   1974    Galipatalu as Pandu
   1974    Tulabharam as Brahmanandam
	1976	Bu as Chillara Donga
   1976    Maa Daivam
	1976	Ramarajyamlo Rakthapasam	
	1976	Sri Rajeswari Vilas Coffee Club
   1976    Soggadu
   1976    Bhale Dongalu
   1977    Edureeta
	1977	Indradhanusu
	1977	Dongalaku Donga as Suri
	1978	Agent Gopi	
   1979    Dongalaku Saval
   1979    Maavari Manchitanam
   1980    Punnami Naagu
	1981	Premabhishekam
   1981    Rahasya Goodachari	
   1982    Nijam Chepithe Nerama as Raghavulu
   1982    Bangaru Koduku as Raju
	1984	Allulu Vasthunnaru
   1985    Lanchavatharam
   1986    Karu Diddina Kapuram
   1987    Rowdy Babai	
   1987    Dabbevariki Chedu 
   1987    Samrat as Rangayya
	1988	Khaidi No. 786	
   1988    Kaliyuga Karnudu as Gumastha of Sarath Chandra Prasad
	1989	Bamma Maata Bangaru Baata	
	1989	Gandipeta Rahasyam
   1989    Palnati Rudrayya as Simhachalam	
	1993	Mayalodu as Padmanabham
	1994	Bhairava Dweepam	
	1995	Subhamasthu 
	1996	Sri Krishnarjuna Vijayam	
   1997    Aashadam Pellikoduku
   1998    Pandaga
   2004    Mee Intikosthe Emistaaru Maa Intikoste Emi Testaaru
	2005	Bhadra	
	2005	Chakram	
   2006    Tata Birla Madhyalo Laila as Padmanabham

As producer
 1965 Devata 
 1966 Potti Pleader
 1967 Sri Sri Sri Maryada Ramanna 
 1969 Sri Rama Katha
 1970 Kathanayika Molla

As director
 1969 Sri Rama Katha
 1969 Midatam Bottulu
 1970 Kathanayika Molla
 1974 Pellikaani Thandri

References

1931 births
2010 deaths
Indian male comedians
Indian male film actors
Film producers from Andhra Pradesh
Indian male stage actors
Telugu comedians
Telugu film producers
20th-century Indian male actors
Nandi Award winners
People from Kadapa district
Male actors from Andhra Pradesh
Film directors from Andhra Pradesh
Telugu film directors
20th-century Indian film directors
Male actors in Telugu cinema
Telugu male actors